Björn Ekwall, born 1940, died 2000, was a Swedish cell toxicologist, known for his pioneering work in in vitro toxicology.

Biography 
Ekwall was born in Uppsala in 1940. He studied at Uppsala University Medical School and got his Doctor of Medicine degree in 1969. After a short time, he served as a lecturer at the Department of Anatomy at Uppsala University. He completed his PhD at the same university and was a postdoc for six months at Materials Science Technology Laboratories, Memphis, Tennessee, between 1981-1982.

During 1982-1983 he worked as a consultant at the Toxicology Laboratory of the Swedish Food Administration. In 1983 he founded the Cytotoxicology Laboratory (CTLU) in Uppsala.

Selected work and publications 
Ekwall is known for his two main projects: Multicentre Evaluation of In Vitro Cytotoxicity (MEIC) and Evaluation-Guided Development of In Vitro Toxicity and Toxicokinetic Tests (EDIT) which became basis for later international EU projects such as ACuteTox, Sens-it-iv and ReProTect. MEIC evaluated the usefulness of in vitro tests for the estimation of human acute systemic toxicity. Started in 1999, the purpose of EDIT was to establish and validate in vitro tests relevant to toxicokinetics and for organ-specific toxicity, to be incorporated into optimal test batteries for the estimation of human acute systemic toxicity.

He has authored and co-authored many publications, including the following:

 Toxicity to HeLa cells of 205 drugs as determined by the metabolic inhibition test supplemented by microscopy, Toxicology, 17 (1980), pp. 273-295
 Preliminary studies on the validity of in vitro measurement of drug toxicity using HeLa cells II. Drug toxicity in the MIT-24 system compared with mouse and human lethal dosage of 52 drug, Toxicology Letters, 5 (1980), pp. 309-317
 MEIC- a new international multicenter project to evaluate the relevance to human toxicity of in vitro cytotoxicity tests, Cell Biology and Toxicology, 5 (1989), pp. 331-347
 Overview of the final MEIC results II. The in vitro/in vivo evaluation, including a selection of a practical battery of cell tests for prediction of acute lethal blood concentrations in human, Toxicology in Vitro, 13 (1999), pp. 665-673
 EDIT: a new international multicenter program to develop and evaluate batteries of in vitro tests for acute and chronic systematic toxicity, ATLA, 27 (1999), pp. 339-349

Björn Ekwall Memorial Foundation (BEMF) 
The foundation was established in 2001 by the Scandinavian Society for Cell Toxicology (SSCT) in memory of Björn Ekwall. The foundation rewards Björn Ekwall Memorial Award (BEMA) to the scientist from around the world each year for excellent work in cell toxicology contributing towards the replacement of animal experiments by alternative toxicity tests and approaches.

Recipients of Björn Ekwall Memorial Award (BEMA) 
So far, the following scientists have received the BEMA.

References 

Swedish scientists
1940 births
2000 deaths
Toxicologists
20th-century Swedish scientists
Uppsala University alumni